Argyrotaenia spaldingiana is a species of moth of the family Tortricidae. It is found in the United States, where it has been recorded from Utah and Nevada.

References

Moths described in 1961
spaldingiana
Moths of North America